Wellfleet may refer to:

 Geography
 Wellfleet, Massachusetts, a town in Massachusetts
 Wellfleet Center Historic District
 Wellfleet, Nebraska, a town in Nebraska

 Other
 Camp Wellfleet, a former United States military training camp in Wellfleet, Massachusetts
 Wellfleet Communications, a former Internet router company
 Wellfleet Drive-In Theater, a drive-in cinema in Wellfleet, Massachusetts
 Wellfleet oyster, a name for the eastern oyster (Crassostrea virginica)
 Wellfleet Railroad Station, a former railroad station in Wellfleet, Massachusetts